Tomás Esteban Cuello (born 5 March 2000) is an Argentine professional footballer who plays as a wide midfielder for Athletico Paranaense.

Club career

Atlético Tucumán
After appearing on the bench for Atlético Tucumán in a 2017 Copa Libertadores match against Jorge Wilstermann on 11 April 2017, Cuello made his professional debut five days later on 16 April in an Argentine Primera División game versus San Lorenzo. By doing so, he became the first player born in the 2000s to play in Argentina's top-flight.

Red Bull Bragantino (loan)
After twenty appearances, which included appearances in the Copa Libertadores and Copa Sudamericana, Cuello departed on loan to Red Bull Bragantino in February 2020. He made his debut during a 1–1 draw at the Maracanã against Flamengo on 15 October 2020. Twenty-four appearances later, Cuello scored his first senior goal during a Copa do Brasil first round victory away to Mirassol, as the midfielder netted a stoppage time winner at the Estádio Kléber Andrade.

Athletico Paranaense
On 24 February 2022, Cuello signed a four-year contract with Athletico Paranaense.

International career
In February 2017, Cuello was called up by the Argentina U17s for their pre-2017 South American Under-17 Football Championship training camp. He was selected for U20 training in September and October 2017. In February 2018, Cuello was called up to train with the U19 team.

Career statistics
.

References

External links
 

2000 births
Living people
Sportspeople from San Miguel de Tucumán
Argentine footballers
Association football midfielders
Argentine expatriate footballers
Expatriate footballers in Brazil
Argentine expatriate sportspeople in Brazil
Argentine Primera División players
Campeonato Brasileiro Série A players
Atlético Tucumán footballers
Red Bull Bragantino players
Club Athletico Paranaense players